Dharma & Greg is an American television sitcom that aired from September 24, 1997, to April 30, 2002.

It stars Jenna Elfman and Thomas Gibson as Dharma and Greg Montgomery, a couple who got married on their first date despite being complete opposites. The series is co-produced by Chuck Lorre Productions, More-Medavoy Productions and 4 to 6 Foot Productions in association with 20th Century Fox Television for ABC.  The show's theme song was written and performed by composer Dennis C. Brown.

Series overview

Episodes

Season 1 (1997–98)

Season 2 (1998–99)

Season 3 (1999–2000)

Season 4 (2000–01)

Season 5 (2001–02)

Dharma and Greg

it:Dharma & Greg#Episodi